The 1927–28 Connecticut Aggies men's basketball team represented Connecticut Agricultural College, now the University of Connecticut, in the 1927–28 collegiate men's basketball season. The Aggies completed the season with an 11–3 overall record. The Aggies were members of the New England Conference, where they ended the season with a 3–1 record. The Aggies played their home games at Hawley Armory in Storrs, Connecticut, and were led by first-year head coach Louis A. Alexander.

Schedule 

|-
!colspan=12 style=""| Regular Season

Schedule Source:

References 

UConn Huskies men's basketball seasons
Connecticut
Connecticut Aggies men's basketball team
Connecticut Aggies men's basketball team